The Masonic Temple Building  in Vermilion, Ohio, located on Main St., is a building from 1870. It was listed on the National Register of Historic Places in 1979.

The current Masonic lodge in Vermillion, "Ely Lodge #424", is located at 654-1/2 Main Street.

References

Clubhouses on the National Register of Historic Places in Ohio
Italianate architecture in Ohio
Masonic buildings completed in 1870
Buildings and structures in Erie County, Ohio
National Register of Historic Places in Erie County, Ohio
Masonic buildings in Ohio
1870 establishments in Ohio